Hoita orbicularis is a species of legume known by the common name roundleaf leather-root. It is endemic to California, where it is relatively widespread throughout the state's mountain ranges, growing most often in moist habitat. The herbage is glandular and often hairy. Each of the many flowers is one or two centimeters long, pealike, and generally a shade of light to medium purple in color.

External links
Jepson Manual Treatment
USDA Plants Profile
Photo gallery

Psoraleeae
Flora of California
Flora without expected TNC conservation status